Peter Bradley may refer to:

Sports
Peter Bradley (cricketer) (born 1937), English cricketer

Religious figures
Peter Bradley (Archdeacon of Warrington) (born 1949), British Anglican priest and Archdeacon of Warrington
Peter Bradley (priest) (born 1964), British Anglican priest and Dean of Sheffield

Others
Peter Bradley (politician) (born 1953), English politician
Peter Bradley (artist) (born 1940), American painter and sculptor
Pete Bradley, character in the 1997 film Defying Gravity

See also